Karmøy may refer to :

Places
 Karmøy (island), an island in Rogaland county, Norway
 Karmøy, a municipality in Rogaland county, Norway
 Karmøy Airport, an airport on the island of Karmøy in Norway
 Karmøy (Antarctica), an island in Antarctica

Other
 Karmøy-Posten, a now-defunct Norwegian newspaper

Disambiguation pages